Christ Church Nichola Town is one of 14 administrative parishes that make up Saint Kitts and Nevis. Christ Church Nichola Town is the fifth largest parish on Saint Kitts and is located on the east coast of the main island of Saint Kitts. The parish capital is Nichola Town and its largest town is Molyneux.

Villages
Capital – Nichola Town (Christ Church)

Other Villages:

Bourryeux
Lodge Village 
Mansion 
Molyneux (largest village)
Phillips

Notable people from Christ Church Nichola Town Parish
Mary Charles George O.B.E. (1913—2008) educator from Phillips Village and first woman to run for public office. The Molyneux hospital is named in her honor.

References

 
Saint Kitts (island)
Parishes of Saint Kitts and Nevis